The Serbian Cup was the national ice hockey cup in Serbia. It was held from 1995–1996, and again in 2007.

Champions

References

National ice hockey cup competitions in Europe
Ice hockey competitions in Serbia